Oregon Route 38 is an Oregon state highway that runs between the city of Reedsport, on the Oregon Coast, and an interchange with Interstate 5 near the communities of Curtin and Anlauf.  It is also known as most of the Umpqua Highway No. 45 (see Oregon highways and routes), as the western portions of the highway run alongside the Umpqua River.  The highway lies entirely within Douglas County.

Route description

Oregon Route 38 begins (at its western terminus) at a junction with U.S. Route 101 in Reedsport.  It heads due east from there, running alongside the Umpqua River and by the Dean Creek Wildlife Area, which provides overlooks for viewing regional wildlife.  The route continues east after that, passing through the communities of Scottsburg and Green Acres.  

In the city of Elkton, the highway intersects with Oregon Route 138, which continues to follow the Umpqua River, heading south.  OR 38 continues east, passing through the Elk Creek Tunnel Forest State Scenic Corridor, as well as the highway tunnel the park is named after.  The highway continues east through the mountains of southwestern Oregon, eventually reaching the community of Drain.  In Drain, it intersects with Oregon Route 99; OR 38 continues northeast from Drain on an alignment shared with OR 99.  Just south of Curtin, OR 38 ends at an interchange with Interstate 5.  OR 99 continues north, sharing an alignment with I-5 (diverting from it once again when it the highway reaches the city of Cottage Grove).

For the majority of its length, OR 38 is a two-lane undivided highway, with occasional passing lanes.

Major intersections
Note: mileposts do not reflect actual mileage due to realignments.

References

038
Transportation in Douglas County, Oregon
Oregon Coast Range